Passa Passa is a weekly street party that originated in Kingston, Jamaica and has spread to other areas in the Caribbean. It is reported to have begun on Ash Wednesday in 2003 with the name being coined by Carl Shelley. It features dancehall music. It has spread throughout the Caribbean including Colón, Panama Limón, Costa Rica and later  Puerto Rico. It is similar to a block party. The Passa Passa usually gets started around 1 a.m. and has been known to continue straight through until 8 a.m.

Artists, selectors, and dancers who usually attend and have done a great deal to build the dance for what it is today include: Bogle, Ding Dong (dancehall performer), Marvin, Kartoon, Aneika Headtop, Ravers Clavers, Black Blingaz, Timeless Crew, Shelly Belly, Spikes, John Hype, Sample 6, Sherika Future, Jermaine Squad, Sadiki, Swatch, Maestro, Beenie Man and Future Girls.

Passa Passa has drawn many professional and amateur dancers into the media spotlight as the event is typically videotaped for mass DVD distribution. Many of the popular Jamaican dancers, such as the late Bogle and Ding Dong, have made appearances on these videos.  The spread of dancehall popularity, particularly in Japan and Europe, attracts many international dancehall fans along with the hundreds of Jamaicans who attend weekly.            

          

Grenada's Education Minister, Claris Charles, called for a ban of the dance in that country in 2006.

External links
Balford Henry: "The 'Passa Passa' phenomenon"  The Jamaica Observer, November 21, 2003 (copy at the Internet Archive)
J.A.Wallace: "PASSA PASSA is destroying our moral values" article from Grenadian Connection web site, March 11, 2006
"Dancing Against the Beat" article from Los Angeles Times
Photos of Passa Passa in Kingston

Dance festivals in Jamaica
Recurring events established in 2003
Electronic music festivals in Jamaica
Reggae festivals in Jamaica
Dancehall